KFMQ (106.1 FM) is a commercial mainstream rock radio station licensed to Gallup in the U.S. state of New Mexico.  The station is currently owned by iHeartMedia, Inc.

References

External links
 

FMQ
Mainstream rock radio stations in the United States
Radio stations established in 1987
IHeartMedia radio stations